|}

The Fillies' Sprint Stakes is a Group 3 flat horse race in Ireland open to two-year-old thoroughbred fillies. It is run at Naas over a distance of 6 furlongs (1,207 metres), and it is scheduled to take place each year in May or June.

History
The event was established in 2002, and it was originally sponsored by Swordlestown Stud. It initially held Listed status, and was promoted to Group 3 level in 2006.

The 2008 edition was run in memory of Cathal Ryan, the former owner of Swordlestown Stud. The sponsorship was taken over by Coolmore Stud in 2009.

The Fillies' Sprint Stakes was relegated back to Listed level in 2011 but regained Group 3 status in 2019.

Records
Leading jockey (4 wins):
 Seamie Heffernan - Miss Childrey (2003), You'resothrilling (2007), Servalan (2018), Etoile (2019)

Leading trainer (7 wins):
 Aidan O'Brien – Rumplestiltskin (2005), You'resothrilling (2007), Lillie Langtry (2009), Cuff (2016), Etoile (2019), Mother Earth (2020), Meditate (2022)

Winners

See also
 Horse racing in Ireland
 List of Irish flat horse races

References

Sources
 Racing Post:
 
 galopp-sieger.de – Cathal Ryan Memorial Sprint Stakes.
 horseracingintfed.com – International Federation of Horseracing Authorities – Fillies' Sprint Stakes (2010).
 pedigreequery.com – Swordlestown Stud Sprint Stakes – Naas.

Flat races in Ireland
Flat horse races for two-year-old fillies
Recurring sporting events established in 2002
Naas Racecourse
2002 establishments in Ireland